Minedykkerkommandoen (MDK) or Norwegian Naval EOD Command is a clearance diver group. MDK is subordinate to the Royal Norwegian Navy. MDK is located at Haakonsvern Naval Base in Bergen and Ramsund Naval Base, in vicinity of Harstad.

The Commando is part of the naval contribution to the Norwegian Armed Forces Intervention Force, and the command's personnel have taken part in operations in Afghanistan, Iraq, Baltic states and Mediterranean, among others. The unit is often on assignment for the Norwegian Police Service with bomb disposal.

History
In 1953 the Norwegian Navy formed a frogman-unit. This unit was under the command of Ove Lund, and is the origin of the modern Minedykkerkommandoen and Marinejegerkommandoen. The mission of the frogmen was to disarm explosive devices and to conduct sabotage against enemy targets above and below water.

The missions gradually become more comprehensive and different frogman specialities emerged. This led to members of the unit being divided into a clearance diver team and two combat swimmer teams, in 1968.

Selection and training 
General selection separates out those who do not have physical and mental abilities to start the clearance diver course. A candidate must contest a strength test, fitness test and a water stress test.

After passing the general selection, an applicant attends the main selection, performed in the winter. It comprises physical and mental exercises with little food and little sleep. Few of those who enter get through.

Following selection, the potential operator starts basic training for 12 months at the Norwegian Naval Diving School, Dykker- og froskemannskolen. This training involves all basic disciplines required to serve as a clearance diver. After training, the candidates who are eligible for operational service are transferred to MDK, to become an EOD operator. Further training is conducted domestically or abroad, at allied training facilities.

See also
 
  (Elite special-purpose force established by the US Navy during WW II)
  (German Navy Clearance Divers)
 
  (Canadian Clearance Divers and Combat Divers)
  (French Marine Nationale Special Operations Force)
  Royal Australian Navy
  (Danish Maritime Special Force)
  (Norwegian Navy Coastal Ranger Command)
  (Norwegian Maritime Special Operations Forces, Command frogmen)

References

External links
 Minedykker - Forsvaret.no

Royal Norwegian Navy
Armed forces diving